Henry Watson Griffith (January 11, 1897 – July 21, 1956) was an American businessman, newspaper publisher and politician from New York.

Life

He was born on January 11, 1897, in Palmyra, Wayne County, New York, the son of State Senator Frederick W. Griffith (1858–1928) and Mary (Adams) Griffith. He graduated from Palmyra High School in 1914, and in absentia from Hamilton College in 1918. During World War I he was a second lieutenant of field artillery of the U.S. Army. In 1925, he married Agnes Stuart McLouth (1899-1986) and built his bride a home at 353 Canandaigua Street in Palmyra, New York. They had four daughters: Mary Adams Griffith (1928-2007); Carolyn McLouth Griffith (1930-1998); Agnes Elizabeth Griffith (1931); and Margaret Malette Griffith (1933-2018). He published the Palmyra Courier–Journal, a weekly newspaper.

Griffith was a member of the New York State Senate from 1939 to 1950, sitting in the 162nd, 163rd, 164th, 165th, 166th and 167th New York State Legislatures. In 1950, he ran for re-nomination, but was defeated in the Republican primary by George R. Metcalf.

He died on July 21, 1956, while on a fishing trip at his lodge on Weslemkoon Lake in Ontario, Canada, of a heart attack.

Sources

1897 births
1956 deaths
People from Palmyra, New York
Republican Party New York (state) state senators
Hamilton College (New York) alumni
United States Army officers
20th-century American politicians